Ludwig Kasper (2 May 1893 – 28 August 1945) was an Austrian sculptor.

Biography 

Born in Gurten, Austria, on May 2, 1893, Ludwig Kasper was the son of a farmer. He received artistic training as a sculptor in Hallstatt (Tyrol), then with Hermann Hahn in Munich, and, with the help of scholarships, in Greece and in Rome.

He worked in Berna (Silesia), in Paris, and in Berlin. This last period of creation was the most fertile for him.

In 1930, he married the artist Ottilie Wolf.

Between 1943 and 1944, he taught sculpture at the School of Art of Braunschweig. The bombardment of that city led him to return to Austria. He died on August 28, 1945, in Braunau from a kidney ailment.

His works were exhibited during Documenta 1 in 1955, which was the first in the series of renowned documenta exhibitions in Kassel.

1893 births
1945 deaths
Modern sculptors
Austrian male sculptors
Deaths from kidney failure
20th-century Austrian sculptors
20th-century Austrian male artists
Austrian expatriates in France
Austrian expatriates in Germany